Bertram Tracy Clayton (October 19, 1862 – May 30, 1918) was an American soldier and politician who served as a U.S. Representative from New York from 1899 to 1901.

Biography
Born on the Clayton estate near Clayton, Alabama, he went on to attend the United States Military Academy, graduating in 1886 with John J. Pershing. He was then appointed a second lieutenant in the Eleventh Regiment, United States Infantry and served until April 30, 1888, when he resigned to go into business as a civil engineer. May 20, 1898 he went on to serve with Troop C, New York Volunteer Cavalry (Brooklyn's Own) during the Spanish–American War in Puerto Rico, winning distinction.

Tenure in Congress 
After the war, Clayton served in the House of Representatives from 1899 until 1901, representing New York's fourth district. After an unsuccessful reelection bid, he was appointed as a captain in the Regular Army.

World War I 
He stayed on active duty and was promoted several times up to the rank of colonel, serving in the Quartermaster Corps until World War I.

While serving in France as quartermaster of the 1st Infantry Division, Clayton was killed during a German air raid on American trenches. He was the highest ranking West Point graduate killed in action during the war. Clayton is buried at Arlington National Cemetery with his wife, Mary Elizabeth D'Aubert Clayton.

Family 
His brother, Henry De Lamar Clayton, Jr., also served as a Member of Congress from their home state, Alabama. Their father, Henry DeLamar Clayton, Sr., was a prominent judge and major general in the Confederate army during the American Civil War and president of the University of Alabama.

References

Arlington National Cemetery 
Who's Who in America

1862 births
1918 deaths
Burials at Arlington National Cemetery
People from Clayton, Alabama
United States Military Academy alumni
United States Army colonels
Military personnel from Alabama
Military personnel from New York (state)
American military personnel killed in World War I
Democratic Party members of the United States House of Representatives from New York (state)
19th-century American politicians
United States Army personnel of World War I
Deaths by airstrike during World War I